Aleksey Nikolayevich Botyan other name, Alexei Botian (10 February 1917 – 13 February 2020) was a Soviet and Russian spy and intelligence officer. He was awarded the title of Hero of the Russian Federation in 2007 for his role in protecting the Polish city of Kraków from destruction by the Nazis in January 1945.

Botyan died in Moscow on 13 February 2020, at the age of 103. President of Russia Vladimir Putin offered his condolences in an official message, stating "The legendary scout, a strong, extraordinary personality, passed away. He was the leader and participant in brilliant special operations, which became an important contribution to the Great Victory and are forever inscribed in domestic and world history." Botyan was buried with military honours in the Alley of Heroes in the Troyekurovskoye Cemetery on 17 February.

References

1917 births
2020 deaths
People from Valozhyn District
People from Vilna Governorate
Heroes of the Russian Federation
Recipients of the Order "For Merit to the Fatherland", 4th class
Recipients of the Order of Courage
Recipients of the Order of the Red Banner
Recipients of the Order of the Red Banner of Labour
Recipients of the Silver Cross of the Virtuti Militari
Belarusian partisans
Men centenarians
NKVD officers
Polish September Campaign participants
Russian centenarians
Soviet colonels
Soviet partisans
Soviet spies
Burials in Troyekurovskoye Cemetery